is a Japanese anime screenwriter and novelist, best known for writing the scripts for Kyoto Animation's anime adaptations of Key visual novels.

Novels
, illustrated by You Shiina (July 2014, Famitsu Bunko)

Screenwriting
Head writer credits are denoted in bold.

Television
 Wrestler Gundan Gingahen Seisenshi Robin Jr. (1989-1990)
 Brave Exkaiser (1990-1991)
 The Brave Fighter of Sun Fighbird (1991)
 Matchless Raijin-Oh (1991-1992)
 Magical Princess Minky Momo: Hold on to Your Dreams (1992)
 The Brave Fighter of Legend Da-Garn (1992)
 Genki Bakuhatsu Ganbaruger (1992-1993)
 Tetsujin 28 FX (1992-1993)
 Nekketsu Saikyō Go-Saurer (1993-1994)
 Mobile Fighter G Gundam (1994-1995)
 Raideen the Superior (1996-1997)
 Anime Ganbare Goemon (1997-1998)
 Futari Kurashi (1998)
 Generator Gawl (1998)
 Space Pirate Mito (1999)
 Dai-Guard (1999-2000)
 Bikkuriman 2000 (1999-2001)
 Shin Megami Tensei: Devil Children (2000-2001)
 Hamtaro (2000-2004)
 Baki the Grappler (2001)
 The Prince of Tennis (2001-2005)
 Full Metal Panic! (2002)
 Gravion (2002)
 Shin Megami Tensei: Devil Children - Light & Dark (2002-2003)
 Full Metal Panic? Fumoffu (2003)
 Burst Angel (2004)
 Gravion Zwei (2004)
 Full Metal Panic! The Second Raid (2005)
 Air (2005)
 Idaten Jump (2005-2006)
 Fate/stay night (2006)
 The Melancholy of Haruhi Suzumiya (2006, 2009)
 Kanon (2006-2007)
 When They Cry: Kai (2007)
 Clannad (2007-2009)
 Umineko When They Cry (2009)
 Fairy Tail (2009-2016, 2018-2019)
 Infinite Stratos (2011)
 Kokoro Connect (2012)
 The Pet Girl of Sakurasou (2012)
 Majestic Prince (2013)
 Non Non Biyori (2013)
 Golden Time (2013)
 Engaged to the Unidentified (2014)
 Amagi Brilliant Park (2014)
 Aria the Scarlet Ammo AA (2015)
 Myriad Colors Phantom World (2016)
 Magic of Stella (2016)
 New Game! (2016-2017)
 Miss Kobayashi’s Dragon Maid (2017)
 The Ryuo's Work Is Never Done! (2018)
 Miss Caretaker of Sunohara-sou (2018)
 Anima Yell! (2018)
 Wataten!: An Angel Flew Down to Me (2019)
 How Heavy Are the Dumbbells You Lift%3F (2019)
 Diary of Our Days at the Breakwater (2020)
 Bofuri (2020)
 Ikebukuro West Gate Park (2020)
 Talentless Nana (2020)
 Bottom-tier Character Tomozaki (2021)
 Miss Kobayashi’s Dragon Maid S (2021)
 Shaman King (2021-present)
 Don't Hurt Me, My Healer! (2022)
 Date A Live IV (2022)

OVAs
 Ozanari Dungeon: The Tower of Wind (1991)
 Time Stranger Kyoko: Leave It to Chocola (2001)
 Higurashi When They Cry: Kira (2011-2012)

Films
 The Prince of Tennis: A Gift from Atobe (2005)
 The Disappearance of Haruhi Suzumiya (2010)
 Garakowa: Restore the World (2015)

References

External links

Living people
Japanese novelists
Japanese screenwriters
Anime screenwriters
Year of birth missing (living people)